The 2016–17 Swiss Challenge League, known for sponsorship reasons as the Brack.ch Challenge League, was the 14th season of the Swiss Challenge League, the second tier in the Swiss football pyramid. It began on 23 July 2016 and ended on 3 June 2017.

On 1 May 2017 FC Le Mont decided to voluntarily relegate three steps down in the league system after being denied a licence to play in the Swiss Challenge League.

On 18 May 2017, Zürich became champions of the 2016–17 Challenge League following their 1–1 draw against Servette and Neuchâtel Xamax's 2–1 defeat at Schaffhausen. They are thus promoted back to the top flight immediately following their relegation the previous season.

Participating teams
2015–16 Swiss Challenge League champions FC Lausanne-Sport were promoted to the 2016–17 Swiss Super League. They were replaced by FC Zürich, who got relegated after last place finish in the 2015–16 Swiss Super League. FC Biel-Bienne got relegated from the Challenge League as the Swiss Football League stripped Biel-Bienne of their league licence. Servette FC won promotion from the 2015–16 1. Liga Promotion.

Stadia and locations

Personnel and kits

Managerial changes

League table

Results

First and Second Round

Third and Fourth Round

References

External links
 
Soccerway

Swiss Challenge League
2
Swiss Challenge League seasons